May refer to

See also
 Sandeepa Dhar, Indian actress
 Sandwip, an island in Sandwip Upazila
 Sandwip Upazila, a sub-district in Bangladesh